A rag doll is a children's toy. It is a cloth figure, a doll traditionally home-made from (and stuffed with) spare scraps of material. They are one of the oldest children's toys in existence. Today, many rag dolls are commercially produced to simulate the features of the original home-made dolls, such as simple features, soft cloth bodies, and patchwork clothing.

History 
Traditionally home-made from (and stuffed with) spare scraps of material, they are one of the oldest children's toys in existence. The British Museum has a Roman rag doll, found in a child's grave dating from the 1st to 5th century AD. Historically, rag dolls have been used as comfort objects, and to teach young children nurturing skills. They were often used to teach children how to sew, as the children could practice sewing clothes for the doll and make some simple dolls themselves. In America, from the colonial era up to the early 20th century, children of various statuses would play with dolls made from rags or cornhusks. Mass production of rag dolls began around 1830, when fabric color printing was first developed.

Types

Amish 

Amish dolls are a type of traditional American rag dolls which originated as children's toys among the Old Order Amish people. These dolls commonly have no facial features.

Mexican

Slavic 

Motanka dolls (Polish motanka, Ukrainian мо́танка, from motać/мотати - to tangle/spool) are a type of traditional amulet dolls made in Poland, Ukraine, Belarus and Russia. They were a part of folk culture (Vasilisa the Beautiful) and its magical beliefs, made and tied without the use of a needle or other sharp objects, to "not poke/hurt the fate" and traditionally had no facial features, sometimes with a cross instead. Motanka dolls were made with specific intentions and wishes/tasks for them to grant, of various sorts, such as guarding the family or a prosperous marriage. Nowadays motanka dolls are coming back to popularity as a part of interest in Slavic cultures of the past, often as an educational device during educational and ethnographic workshops, or as a work of folk artists.

Commercially produced 
Today, many rag dolls are commercially produced to simulate the features of the original home-made dolls, such as simple features, soft cloth bodies, and patchwork clothing. One prominent example of a commercially produced ragdoll is the Raggedy Ann doll. Raggedy Ann first appeared in 1918 as the main character of a series of children's stories by Johnny Gruelle. Raggedy Andy, her brother, was introduced in 1920.

Traditional materials 
In their earlier forms, rag dolls were made out of cloth scraps or cornhusks. In the 19th and 20th century, rag dolls were made out of stockinette, felt, or velvet.

In popular culture 
Rag dolls have featured in a number of children's stories, like the 19th century character Golliwogg, Raggedy Ann in the 1918 book by Johnny Gruelle and the British children's television series Bagpuss and Ragdolly Anna, and Emilia from the Brazilian fantasy novel series Sítio do Picapau Amarelo by Monteiro Lobato. The character of Sally from The Nightmare Before Christmas is also a rag doll. In the Lilo & Stitch franchise, Lilo Pelekai owns a rag doll that she made herself named Scrump, who she holds onto as a comfort object.

See also 
 Stuffed toy
 Lalaloopsy

References 

 
Dolls
Traditional dolls
Textile arts
English folklore
Talismans
Amulets
Magic items
European witchcraft
Cunning folk